Major General Khan Firoz Ahmed ndc, afwc, psc is a two-star general of the Bangladesh Army. He is currently serving as the Military Secretary in Army Headquarters, Dhaka Cantonment. He also served as Acting Adjutant General in January 2023.Before serving as Military Secretary, he was the General Officer Commanding (GOC) of the 7th Infantry Division & Area Commander, Barishal Area from 02 December 2021 to 27 August 2022. He also served as the Defense Advisor of Bangladesh permanent mission to UN 2017 to 2020. He was promoted to the rank of Major General on 2 December 2021. He was commissioned in the East Bengal Regiment with the 23rd BMA Long Course on 21 December 1990.

Early life and education 
Ahmed was born on 10 April 1969 in Khulna. He completed his SSC and HSC from Khulna Zilla School and Government Sundarban College respectively. While he stood 9th in the Jessore Board. Ahmed graduated from Defence Services Command and Staff College in Mirpur and second one from Command and Staff College, Quetta, Pakistan. He attained three Master's degrees on varied disciplines. He completed afwc and ndc from National Defense College, Mirpur, Bangladesh. He is also working on his PhD Research from Bangladesh University of Professionals (BUP).

Career 
Ahmed was the defence advisor to the Permanent Mission of Bangladesh to the United Nations and during his tenure 12 Bangladeshi peacekeepers had been honored by UN secretary general.

Personal life 
Ahmed is married and a father of a daughter and a son.

See also
 List of serving generals of the Bangladesh Army

References 

Bangladeshi generals
Bangladeshi military personnel
Bangladesh Army generals
1969 births
Living people
National Defence College (Bangladesh) alumni